The Occupy movement hand signals are a group of hand signals used by Occupy movement protesters to negotiate a consensus. Hand signals are used instead of conventional audible signals, like applause, shouts, or booing, because they do not interrupt the speaker using the human microphone, a system where the front of the crowd repeats the speaker so that the content can be heard at the back of the crowd. The signals have been compared to other hand languages used by soldiers, cliques and Wall Street traders.

Between sharing of information on Facebook, Twitter, and other news reports, the hand signals have become common at other Occupy movement protest locations. Some protesters go to neighboring groups to assist in teaching the hand signals along with other general cooperation. There are YouTube videos showing the hand signals, though the signals are not universal at all locations.

Example signals

Twinkles and down twinkles are referred to as a "temperature check". They indicate if a group is getting close to consensus. Twinkles are also known as "sparkle" or "jazz hands" or spirit fingers.

Origins

In addition to commonalities with various sign languages, and cultural gestures, these or similar hand signals have been used by other groups and events prior to the Occupy Wall Street protests. These include:
 Camp for Climate Action
 The Woodcraft Folk
 Direct Action Network
 The 15-M Movement beginning in Spain 2011
 UK Uncut
 Civil rights movement
 Quaker meetings
Global Justice Movement

Influence

Some followers of agile software development processes have drawn on the Occupy movement's hand signs in an attempt to improve communication during meetings, notably the UK's Government Digital Service.

After the Occupy movements, these hand signals were used by other social movements such as the School strike for the climate, Ende Gelände and Extinction Rebellion.

See also

 Consensus decision-makinghand signals
 Hand signaling (open outcry)
 Human microphone
 Jazz hands
 Thames Valley Climate Action

References

Occupy Wall Street
Occupy movement in the United States
Hand gestures